Lawrence J. Appel is the C. David Molina Professor of Medicine and Director of the Welch Center for Prevention, Epidemiology and Clinical Research at Johns Hopkins University, a joint program of the Johns Hopkins University School of Medicine and the Bloomberg School of Public Health. Dr. Appel is a primary care internist who holds a primary appointment in the Department of Medicine with joint appointments in the Department of Epidemiology, International Health, and Nursing. In addition, he directs the ProHealth Clinical Research Unit. The focus of his career is the conduct of clinical, epidemiologic, and translational research pertaining to the prevention and control of high blood pressure, cardiovascular-kidney diseases, and other chronic conditions, primarily through nutrition-based interventions.

Education
Appel received his M.D. from New York University School of Medicine in 1981 and his M.P.H. from the Johns Hopkins Bloomberg School of Public Health in 1989.

Career
Appel joined the faculty of Johns Hopkins University in 1989, and became the director of their Welch Center for Prevention, Epidemiology and Clinical Research in 2010. He was a member of the United States Dietary Guidelines committees in 2005 and 2010.

Research
Appel's research consists of three different types of studies: controlled feeding studies, behavioral intervention trials, and cohort studies pertaining to chronic kidney disease. In 1997, he was the lead author of the study that coined the term "DASH diet". He has also been credited with convincing the FDA that food companies should be able to put labels on their products saying that potassium has health benefits. In 2014, he published a study that found that a low-glycemic index diet did not improve insulin sensitivity, cholesterol levels or blood pressure compared with a high glycemic-index diet.

Honors and awards
Appel was elected to the Institute of Medicine in 2012.

References

External links
Profile at Google Scholar

American nutritionists
Members of the National Academy of Medicine
Johns Hopkins Bloomberg School of Public Health alumni
Living people
New York University Grossman School of Medicine alumni
Johns Hopkins University faculty
Year of birth missing (living people)